Ahmet the Calligrapher was a seventeenth-century Ottoman Empire official venerated as a  Christian saint. According to Christian beliefs he converted to Christianity and was martyred on 3 May 1682; thus he is commemorated as a martyr on this day. The only mentions of him are in Christian hagiographies.

Life
Ahmet lived in Constantinople during the 1600s and was an official in the Ottoman Turkish government before his conversion.

Ahmet owned a Russian concubine whom he allowed to attend one of the Greek Orthodox churches in Constantinople. In time Ahmet began to notice that when his Russian concubine returned from church she was far more gracious and loving than she was before going. Intrigued by this, Ahmet obtained permission to attend the Ecumenical Patriarch's celebration of the Divine Liturgy in Constantinople. Due to his status and identity, his request was not refused, and he was given a discreet place at the Church.

During the Divine Liturgy, Ahmet saw that when the Ecumenical Patriarch blessed the faithful with his trikiri and dikiri his fingers 'beamed' light onto the heads of the faithful Christians, but not his own. Amazed by this miracle, Ahmet requested and received Holy Baptism.

Whatever happened during this period, one day a group of arguing officials asked Ahmet for his opinion of their dispute, to which he replied that there is nothing better than the Christian faith.

For this he was put before the Sultan and qadi. After torture and a few chances to return to Islam he was subsequently beheaded on 3 May 1682.

He is celebrated on 24 December/6 January in Eastern Orthodoxy under the name of Christódoulos (Greek: Χριστόδουλος).

Sources

References

Bibliography
Yurij Maximov, "Svjatye Pravoslavnoj Tcerkvi, obrativshiesja iz islama." Moscow, 2002
 "Hagiographies of the Saints", 24 December, Justin Popović
 "Hagiographies of the Saints", 3 May, Justin Popović
 Ahmed the Calligrapher (ΑΠΟ ΤΟ ΒΙΟ ΤΟΥ AΓΙΟΥ ΑΧΜΕΤ ΤΟΥ ΝΕΟΜΑΡΤΥΡΟΣ.) 
 Saint Ahmed the Calphas the Neomartyr (Άγιος Αχμέτ ο Κάλφας ο Νεομάρτυρας) 

Calligraphers from the Ottoman Empire
Christian saints killed by Muslims
People executed for apostasy from Islam
Civil servants from the Ottoman Empire
Converts to Eastern Orthodoxy from Islam
Christian martyrs
Eastern Orthodox Christians from Turkey
Eastern Orthodox saints
1682 deaths
Turkish former Muslims
People executed by the Ottoman Empire by decapitation